Ihiala is a city in Nigeria, located in the southern part of Anambra State and within the region known as Igboland. It has long served as the local administrative capital of Ihiala Local Government Area. The Local Government Area has a population of about 87,796.

Ihiala is the largest city in Ihiala Local Government Area which also consists of several other towns like Amorka, Azia, Lilu, Okija, Mbosi, Isseke, Orsumoghu, Ubuluisuzor and Uli. It lies in the agricultural belt of the state.

Ihiala is currently represented in the Federal House of Representatives by Honorable Ifeanyi Chudy Momah
The Current Oluoha of Ihiala (Traditional Ruler) is  Igwe Thomas Ikenna Amuta Obidiegwu.

Boundaries 
Ihiala region is located in the  Southwest of Anambra State and to the Northwest, it shares a border with Nnewi Local Government. To the Northeast and the East, with IMO State and to the west with Ekwusigo Local Government. Also to the South is located the Delta State.

Climate 

== In Ihiala, the rainny season is warm, oppressive, and even overcast while the dry season is hot, muggy, and partly cloudy. Over the course of the year, the temperature typically varies from 67 °F to 87 °F and is rarely below 59 °F or above 90 °F.

 Dr. Chinwoke Mbadinuju, former Anambra governor.True son of Uli
 Ebuka Obi-Uchendu lawyer, former reality star on television and popular media personality. True son of Okija
Olaudah Equiano, 18th-century African who gained freedom from slavery in the colonies, and became a prominent abolitionist in Great Britain.
Ifeanyi Chudy Momah Politician, Lawyer, and Legislator. True son of Okija
Allen Onyema, CEO of Air Peace Airlines, True son of Mbosi
Odera Olivia Orji, actress, film director and film producer

References

Local Government Areas in Anambra State
Local Government Areas in Igboland
Populated places in Igboland
Towns in Igboland